The Masked Singer is a Bulgarian reality singing competition television series based on the Masked Singer franchise which originated from the South Korean version of the show King of Mask Singer. It premiered on Nova on 14 September 2019 to 4 December 2021

All episodes of the series are broadcast live.

Cast

Series overview

Format 
Famous celebrities perform songs that they choose for three months. Unique, created especially for the show costumes of animals and mythical creatures hide the identity of the participants at each of their performances on stage. Neither the show team nor even the friends and families of the participants know their identities. All masks are guarded and protected with exceptional security measures. Each week the participants are divided into groups and enter into a musical battle with each other. Before each performance  are revealed clues to help the audience discover them. Additionally, the detectives of the show help the spectators, who give their assumptions after each performance.

Viewers vote for the performances of the participants. The one who collects the smallest voice drops out and takes off his mask. The winner is the one who takes off the mask last.

Season 1 (2019)

Episodes

Week 1 (14 September)

Week 2 (21 September)

Week 3 (28 September)

Week 4 (5 October)

Week 5 (12 October)

Week 6 (19 October)

Week 7 (26 October)

Week 8 (2 November)

Week 9 (9 November)

Week 10 (16 November)

Week 11 (23 November)

Week 12 (30 November)

Week 13 (7 December) - Finale 
Each contestant performed two songs, and performed a group song together, before being unmasked.

 Group Number (Non-Finalists - Albena Mihova, Alisia, Divna, Encho Danailov, Nencho Balabanov, Preyah and Valentin Mihov): "We're Not Gonna Take It" by Twisted Sister

 Guest Performance: "Rockstar" by Nickelback performed by Philip Avramov as "Tiborg."
 Group Number (Finalists): "One Moment in Time" by Whitney Houston
 Men in Black Performance: "I'm Too Sexy" by Right Said Fred

New Year's Concert (2019)

Season 2 (2020)

Episodes

Week 1 (12 September) 
 Every contestant performed and was safe from elimination.

Week 2 (19 September) 

 Guest Performance: "What a Wonderful World" by Louis Armstrong performed by Nikolay Sotirov as "Knight."

Week 3 (26 September) 

 Guest Performance: "All About That Bass" by Meghan Trainor performed by Lazara Zlatareva "Kaka Lara" as "Chicken."

Week 4 (3 October) 

 Guest Performance: "Tears" by Clean Bandit performed by Yoana Dimitrova as "Bee."

Week 5 (10 October) 

 Guest Performance: "Believer" by Imagine Dragons performed by Yonislav Yotov "Toto" as "Lion."

Week 6 (17 October) 

 Guest Performance: "In the Air Tonight" by Phil Collins performed by Slavin Slavchev as "Raven."
 Guest Performance: "Заклинание" by Petar Chernev performed by Dragomir Draganov as "Mummer."

Week 7 (24 October) 

 Guest Performance: "Миллион алых роз" by Alla Pugacheva performed by Anton Stefanov as "Hat."
 Guest Performance: "One Night Only" by Jennifer Hudson performed by Dara Ekimova as "Princess."

Week 8 (31 October) 

 Guest Performance: "Cotton Eye Joe" by Rednex performed by Tsvetelin Atanasov as "Star."

Week 9 (7 November) 

 Guest Performance: "Hijo de la Luna" by Mecano performed by Antoaneta Dobreva "Neti" as "Rose."

Week 10 (14 November) 

 Guest Performance: "Son of a Preacher Man" by Dusty Springfield performed by Milena Markova "Matsa" as "Cocoon."

Week 11 (21 November) 

 Guest Performance: "Черната овца" by Ahat performed by Ruslan Maynov as "Peacock."
 Guest Performance: "Chandelier" by Sia performed by Petya Buyuklieva as "Butterfly."
 Krisko appears on stage as a detective - behind the mask of "Baby"

Week 12 (28 November) 
Each contestant performed two songs. 

 Guest Performance: "Walking By Myself" by Gary Moore performed by Etien Levi as "Scotsman."

Week 13 (5 December) - Finale 
Each contestant performed two songs, and performed a group song together, before being unmasked.

 Guest Performance: "Volare" & "Buleria" by Gipsy Kings performed by Vladi Aprilov as "Bull."
 Group Number (Finalists): "Маска на цветни петна"

New Year's Concert (2020)

References

External links
 
 

2019 Bulgarian television series debuts
2010s Bulgarian television series
Bulgarian television series based on South Korean television series
Bulgaria
Nova (Bulgarian TV channel) original programming